Larry Doyle was an Irish footballer who played for Dolphin and St James's Gate.

He won a junior cap for Ireland in 1927  and he also played for the Ireland senior football team on just one occasion when appeared at left back in a 5–0 defeat to Spain in Dalymount Park, Dublin on 13 December 1931.

Honours
League of Ireland
Winner: 1934–35: 1
Runner Up: 1935–36: 1
Dublin City Cup
1934-35: 1
Leinster Senior League
1929-30, 1930-31: 2
Leinster Senior Cup
Winner: 1931-32: 1
Runner Up: 1930–31, 1932–33: 2
 FAI Cup : 1
 Winner:1937–38
Runner Up: 1931–32, 1932–33: 2 
League of Ireland Shield
Runner Up: 1934–35: 1

References

Republic of Ireland association footballers
Republic of Ireland international footballers
Ireland (FAI) international footballers
League of Ireland players
League of Ireland XI players
Association football defenders
Year of birth missing
Dolphin F.C. players
St James's Gate F.C. players